David Philp (born 8 July 1960) is a former professional football goalkeeper. He was manager of Cornish side St Blazey until 2008.

Philp was born in Newquay and played for the local side, Newquay, before joining Plymouth Argyle in July 1984. He played seven league games for Argyle before returning to non-league football in 1986.

In December 2002, he became Bodmin Town's third manager in the space of five weeks. He stayed until being sacked in May 2003.

In May 2004 he was playing for Liskeard Athletic.

With injury ruling out Newquay's regular keeper, Philp made a return to playing action in February 2007.

Philp left   Newquay in May 2007 and took over as manager of St Blazey the following month.

References

1960 births
Living people
People from Newquay
Footballers from Cornwall
Newquay A.F.C. players
Plymouth Argyle F.C. players
Saltash United F.C. players
Falmouth Town A.F.C. players
Wadebridge Town F.C. players
St Blazey A.F.C. players
Bodmin Town F.C. players
Liskeard Athletic F.C. players
English football managers
Newquay A.F.C. managers
St Blazey A.F.C. managers
Association football goalkeepers
English footballers